Lisec or Lisets may refer to:

in Bulgaria:
 Lisets, Kyustendil Province
 Lisets, Lovech Province
 Lisets Mountain (Kyustendil Province), a mountain range (highest peak 1500 m) in the Krajište region (Краище), Kyustendil Province
 Lisets Mountain (Sofia and Lovech Province), a mountain range (highest peak 1283 m) in Sofia Province and Lovech Province

in North Macedonia:
Lisec, a village in Tetovo Municipality
 Lisec, the highest peak (1754 m) of the Plačkovica mountain range in Vinica Municipality
 Lisec, the highest peak (1934 m) of the Golešnica mountain range

in Slovenia:
Lisec, Tolmin, a settlement in the Municipality of Tolmin
Lisec, Trebnje, a settlement in the Municipality of Trebnje

in Ukraine:
Lisec (Ivano-Frankivsk Oblast), a village in Ivano-Frankivsk Oblast
 Lisec (Khmelnytskyi Oblast), a village in Khmelnytskyi Oblast